Aga Syed Ruhullah Mehdi is a political leader of Jammu and Kashmir. He was MLA Budgam as well as a former cabinet minister. In July 2020, he resigned from the post of chief spokesman.

He is the son of Aga Syed Mehdi.

References

Living people
Year of birth missing (living people)
Place of birth missing (living people)
Jammu and Kashmir MLAs 2002–2008
Jammu and Kashmir MLAs 2008–2014
Jammu and Kashmir MLAs 2014–2018
Jammu & Kashmir National Conference politicians